Third Avenue is a north-south thoroughfare on the East Side of the New York City borough of Manhattan, as well as in the center portion of the Bronx. Its southern end is at Astor Place and St. Mark's Place. It transitions into Cooper Square, and further south, the Bowery, Chatham Square, and Park Row. The Manhattan side ends at East 128th Street. Third Avenue is two-way from Cooper Square to 24th Street, but since July 17, 1960 has carried only northbound (uptown) traffic while in Manhattan above 24th Street; in the Bronx, it is again two-way. However, the Third Avenue Bridge carries vehicular traffic in the opposite direction, allowing only southbound vehicular traffic, rendering the avenue essentially non-continuous to motor vehicles between the boroughs.

The street leaves Manhattan and continues into the Bronx across the Harlem River over the Third Avenue Bridge north of East 129th Street to East Fordham Road at Fordham Center, where it intersects with U.S. 1. It is one of the four streets that form The Hub, a site of both maximum traffic and architectural density, in the South Bronx.

Like most urban streets, Third Avenue was unpaved until the late 19th century. In May 1861, according to a letter to the editor of The New York Times, the street was the scene of practice marching for the poorly equipped troops in the 7th New York Volunteer Infantry Regiment: "The men were not in uniform, but very poorly dressed, — in many cases with flip-flap shoes. The business-like air with which they marched rapidly through the deep mud of the Third-avenue was the more remarkable."

Public transportation

Buses
Portions of Third Avenue are served by several routes in Manhattan. Buses serving Third Avenue include the Third and Lexington Avenues Line (or Third and Amsterdam Avenues Line). Note that southbound M98, M101, M102, and M103 service operates on Lexington Avenue north of East 24th Street.

M98: between Hunter College and the Harlem River Drive
M101 and M103: between Cooper Square and East 125th Street
M102: between Cooper Square and East 116th Street

Along the Bronx's Third Avenue also run several bus routes:
Bx2: between East 138th Street to East 149th Street
Bx15 (and formerly Bx55): between East 149th Street and Fordham Plaza
Bx21: between East 138th Street and Boston Road

Subway
Third Avenue was the location of the Third Avenue Railroad, a horsecar line established in 1853 that evolved into one of the largest streetcar systems in Manhattan, the Bronx, and Westchester County. Later it was served by the Third Avenue elevated line, which operated from 1878 until 1955 in Manhattan, and 1973 in the Bronx. The Bx55 replaced the Third Avenue Line in the Bronx in 1973. At the time the El was being torn down in Manhattan, there was a movement to rename the whole of Third Avenue in Manhattan "the Bouwerie" (but not the portion in the Bronx), although it had never been part of the Bowery. Today, the Third Avenue – 149th Street station and Third Avenue – 138th Street station are served by the New York City Subway.

In Manhattan, several crosstown subway routes have entrances on Third Avenue:
 : Lexington Avenue–63rd Street station
 : Lexington Avenue–59th Street station
 : Lexington Avenue–53rd Street station
 : Third Avenue station

See also 

 Second Avenue
 Lexington Avenue
 225 East 86th Street

References
Notes

Bibliography

External links

 Third Avenue Elevated at forgotten-ny.com
 New York Songlines: Third Avenue

 
03
Streets in the Bronx
East Harlem
East Village, Manhattan
Gramercy Park
Kips Bay, Manhattan
Midtown Manhattan
Murray Hill, Manhattan
Upper East Side